Markid, also rendered as Margid or Markit, may refer to:
 Markid, Heris
 Markid, Marand
 Markid Kharabehsi, Marand County